Caoying Road is a station on Line 17 of the Shanghai Metro. It opened with the rest of Line 17 on 30 December 2017.

History 
The station opened for passenger trial operation on 30 December 2017, concurrent with the opening of the rest of Line 17.

Description 
Located at the intersection of Yanggang Road and Caoying Road in the Qingpu District of Shanghai, Caoying Road station serves as a major transportation hub for the area. It is located near the Yinggang Coach Terminal, which formerly served as a major bus terminal with local and intercity connections. However, with the opening of the metro station, many services were relocated to a bus terminal directly adjacent to the station.

An underground structure, the station's concourse, located one level below the street, can be accessed from three entrances. The concourse has a customer service counter, fare gates, and ticket machines. The platform level consists of an island platform, with toilets located on the platform's west end. Like all stations on Line 17, Caoying Road station is fully accessible. An elevator connects the street level to the concourse near Exit 3, while another connects the concourse to the platform within the fare-paid zone.

Exits 
The station has three exits:
 Exit 1: Yinggang Road
 Exit 2: Yinggang Road, Caoying Road
 Exit 3: Caoying Road, Caoying Highway

References 

Railway stations in Shanghai
Shanghai Metro stations in Qingpu District
Railway stations in China opened in 2017
Line 17, Shanghai Metro